The 2016 United States presidential election in Pennsylvania took place on November 8, 2016, as part of the 2016 United States elections in which all 50 states and the District of Columbia participated. Pennsylvania voters chose electors to represent them in the Electoral College via a popular vote.

On April 26, 2016, in the presidential primaries, voters selected the Democratic, Republican, and Green parties' respective nominees for president. Pennsylvania is a closed primary state, meaning voters must have been previously registered with a particular political party in order to vote for one of that parties' candidates, to participate in their respective party primary. The Republican party candidate was Donald Trump, who won Pennsylvania by 44,292 votes out of more than 6,000,000 cast, a difference of 0.72% and the narrowest margin in a presidential election, since 1840 when William Henry Harrison defeated Martin Van Buren by just 0.12%. This made Pennsylvania roughly 2.82% more Republican than the nation-at-large, marking the first time since 1948 that Pennsylvania voted to the right of the national environment. 

Prior to the election, Pennsylvania was expected to be close as polling showed the results within the margin of error, but many election experts viewed that Clinton had an edge. However, on Election Day, Pennsylvania unexpectedly swung to Donald Trump. Trump carried 56 of the state's 67 counties, predominantly rural or suburban counties, while Clinton carried much of the Philadelphia metropolitan area as well as other cities including Pittsburgh, Harrisburg and Scranton. Nonetheless, some areas of traditional Democratic strength such as Luzerne County, where Wilkes-Barre is located, saw swings in margins of up to 25% toward Donald Trump, making him the first Republican candidate for president to win Pennsylvania since George H. W. Bush in 1988. 2016 would also be the first presidential election since 1948 in which the Democratic nominee won the popular vote without the state. Pennsylvania's vote for Donald Trump, along with that of Wisconsin and Michigan, marked the fall of the Democratic Blue Wall, a bloc of over 240 electoral votes that voted solidly Democratic from 1992 to 2012.

Pennsylvania was one of the eleven states to have voted twice for Bill Clinton in 1992 and 1996 which Hillary Clinton lost in 2016. Although Wisconsin eventually delivered the Trump victory, when the Clinton campaign learned that they had lost Pennsylvania, they then knew that they had lost the election. Trump became the first Republican ever to win the White House without carrying Chester or Dauphin Counties, as well as the first to do so without carrying Centre County since Benjamin Harrison in 1888, and the first to do so without carrying Monroe County since Calvin Coolidge in 1924. He also became the first Republican to win Pennsylvania without carrying any of Philadelphia's suburban counties.

Primaries

Democratic primary

Republican primary

Green Party 
Pennsylvania held a series of caucuses throughout April, culminating with a meeting on April 30 in Harrisburg, Pennsylvania, where delegates were assigned.

Democratic National Convention
From July 25 to July 28, 2016, Philadelphia hosted the 2016 Democratic National Convention. It was held at the Wells Fargo Center with ancillary meetings at the Pennsylvania Convention Center. Former Secretary of State Hillary Clinton was chosen as the party's nominee for president by a 59.67% majority of delegates present at the convention roll call and then winning the nomination. While runner-up rival Senator Bernie Sanders received 39.16% of votes from delegates. Clinton becoming the first female candidate to be formally nominated by a major national party as a presidential candidate in the United States. Her running mate, Senator Tim Kaine, the junior United States senator from Virginia was chosen by delegates as the party's nominee for vice president by acclamation.

General election

Predictions

Statewide results

By congressional district
Trump won 12 of 18 congressional districts, including one which elected a Democrat, while Clinton won 6 including two that elected a Republican.

By county

Counties that flipped from Democratic to Republican
 Erie (largest city: Erie)
 Luzerne (largest city: Wilkes-Barre)
 Northampton (largest city: Bethlehem)

Counties that flipped from Republican to Democratic
 Chester (largest borough: West Chester)

See also
 List of United States presidential elections in Pennsylvania
 2016 Democratic Party presidential debates and forums
 2016 Democratic Party presidential primaries
 2016 Republican Party presidential debates and forums
 2016 Republican Party presidential primaries

References

Further reading

External links
 RNC 2016 Republican Nominating Process 
 Green papers for 2016 primaries, caucuses, and conventions

Pennsy
2016
Presidential